Chunri Township is a mountain indigenous township in Pingtung County, Taiwan. The main population is the Paiwan people of the Taiwanese aborigines.

Geography

Administrative divisions
The township comprises six villages: Chunri, Guhua, Guichong, Lili, Qijia and Shiwen.

References

External links 

Chunrih Township Office website 

Townships in Pingtung County
Taiwan placenames originating from Formosan languages